is a Japanese professional golfer.

Matsumura has won twice on the Japan Challenge Tour and five times on the Japan Golf Tour. He has been featured in the top 100 of the Official World Golf Ranking.

Professional wins (7)

Japan Golf Tour wins (5)

1Co-sanctioned by the OneAsia Tour

Japan Golf Tour playoff record (2–0)

Japan Challenge Tour wins (2)

Results in major championships

CUT = missed the halfway cut
Note: Matsumura only played in The Open Championship.

Results in World Golf Championships

"T" = Tied

References

External links

Japanese male golfers
Japan Golf Tour golfers
Sportspeople from Saitama Prefecture
1983 births
Living people